The 2 euro cent coin (€0.02) has a value of one-fiftieth of a euro and is composed of copper-plated steel. All coins have a common reverse and country-specific (national) obverse. The coin has been used since 2002 and was not redesigned in 2007 as were the higher-value coins.

History
The coin dates from 2002, when euro coins and banknotes were introduced in the twelve-member eurozone and its related territories. Despite this, a few coins were issued beginning in 1999. The common side was designed by Luc Luycx, a Belgian artist who won a Europe-wide competition to design the new coins. The design of the 1 to 5 cent coins was intended to show the European Union's (EU) place in the world (relative to Africa and Asia) as opposed to the one and two euro coins showing the 15 states as one and the 10- to 50-cent coins showing separate EU states.

The national sides, then 15 (eurozone + Monaco, San Marino and the Vatican who could mint their own) were each designed according to national competitions, though to specifications which applied to all coins, such as the requirement of including twelve stars (see euro coins for more). National designs were not allowed to change until the end of 2008, unless a monarch (whose portrait usually appears on the coins) died or abdicated. This happened in Monaco and the Vatican City, resulting in three new designs in circulation (the Vatican had an interim design until the new Pope was selected). National designs have seen some changes due to new rules stating that national designs should include the name of the issuing country (Finland and Belgium both do not show their name, and hence have made minor changes).

As the EU's membership has since expanded (in 2004 and 2007), with further expansions envisaged, the common face of all euro coins from the value of 10 cents and above was redesigned in 2007 to show a new map. The 1- to 5-cent coins, however, did not change, as the highlighting of the old members over the globe was so faint it was not considered worth the cost. But new national coin designs were added in 2007 with the entry of Slovenia, in 2008 with Cyprus and Malta, in 2009 with Slovakia, in 2011 with Estonia, in 2014 with Latvia, in 2015 with Lithuania, and in 2023 with Croatia.

Design
The coins are composed of copper-covered steel, with a diameter of 18.75 mm, a 1.67 mm thickness and a mass of 3.06 grams. The edges are smooth with a continuous groove running round the coin. This groove helps distinguish the 2-cent coin from the smooth 1- and 5-cent coins, as well as the U.S. penny, which has the same diameter. The coins have been used from 2002, though some are dated 1999 which is the year the euro was created as a currency, but not put into general circulation.

Reverse (common) side
The reverse was designed by Luc Luycx and displays a globe in the bottom right. The then-fifteen members of the EU are lightly highlighted and the northern half of Africa and the western half of Asia (including the Middle East) are shown. Six fine lines cut diagonally behind the globe from each side of the coin and have twelve stars at their ends (reflective of the flag of Europe). To the top left is a large number 2 followed, in smaller text, by the words "Euro Cent". The designer's initials, LL, appear to the right of the globe.

Starting in 2017 coins from individual member states have started adjusting their common side design to a new version, identified by smaller and more rounded numeral "2" and longer lines outside of the stars at the coin's circumference.

Obverse (national) sides

The obverse side of the coin depends on the issuing country. All have to include twelve stars (in most cases in a circle around the edge), the engraver's initials, and the year of issue. New designs also have to include the name or initials of the issuing country. The side cannot repeat the denomination of the coin unless the issuing country uses an alphabet other than Latin. (Currently this is true only of Greece, which engraves "2 ΛΕΠΤΑ" upon their coins in the Greek alphabet. Austria, which still shows the denomination in German, will have to change its design to comply; see below.)

Planned designs
Austria, Germany and Greece will at some point need to update their designs to comply with guidelines requiring them to include the issuing state's name or initial, and to not repeat the denomination of the coin.

In addition, there are several EU states that have not yet adopted the euro. Some of them have already agreed upon their coin designs, but it is not known exactly when they will adopt the currency, and hence these are not yet minted. See Enlargement of the eurozone for expected entry dates of these countries.

Usage

The one- and two-cent coins were initially introduced in order to ensure that the introduction of the euro was not used as an excuse by retailers to heavily round up prices. However, due to the cost to business and the mints of maintaining a circulation of low value coins, Belgium, Finland, Ireland, Italy, the Netherlands and Slovakia round prices to the nearest five cents (Swedish rounding) for cash payments, producing only a handful of those coins for collectors rather than general circulation. Despite this, the coins are still legal tender and produced outside these states, so if a customer with a two-cent coin minted elsewhere wishes to pay with it, they may.

The Dutch Bank calculated it would save $36 million a year by not using the smaller coins. Other countries such as Germany favoured retaining the coins due to their desire for €1.99 prices, which appear more attractive to the consumer than a €2 price. According to a Eurobarometer survey of EU citizens, 64% across the Eurozone want their removal with prices rounded; with over 70% in Belgium, Ireland, Italy, the Netherlands and Slovakia. Only Portugal and Latvia had a plurality in favour of retaining the coins (49% against removal, 45–46% in favour).

Nicknames

References

External links

 

Euro coins
Two-cent coins